Odd Lirhus (born 18 September 1956) is a former Norwegian biathlete. At the 1984 Winter Olympics in Sarajevo he won a silver medal in the relay. He also won a gold medal in the 20 km individual at the 1978 Biathlon World Championship.  In addition, he won the 20 km individual in Falun in the 1983–84 season.

After that season, Lirhus took a gap year as an active biathlete to be a coach for the Canadian biathlon team, intending to return to biathlon and compete at the World Championships in Holmenkollen. He did not, however, return.

From 2002 to 2005, Lirhus was the head coach for Norwegian women's biathlon team. Liv Grete Skjelbreid Poirée has attributed much of her success at the 2004 World Championships to him.

Biathlon results
All results are sourced from the International Biathlon Union.

Olympic Games
1 medal (1 silver)

World Championships
5 medals (1 gold, 3 silver, 1 bronze)

*During Olympic seasons competitions are only held for those events not included in the Olympic program.

Individual victories
2 victories (2 In)

*Results are from UIPMB and IBU races which include the Biathlon World Cup, Biathlon World Championships and the Winter Olympic Games.

References

External links
 

1956 births
Living people
People from Voss
Norwegian male biathletes
Biathletes at the 1980 Winter Olympics
Biathletes at the 1984 Winter Olympics
Olympic biathletes of Norway
Medalists at the 1984 Winter Olympics
Olympic medalists in biathlon
Olympic silver medalists for Norway
Biathlon World Championships medalists
Sportspeople from Vestland
20th-century Norwegian people